KMSI (88.1 FM, "The Oasis") is an Inspirational radio station serving the Oklahoma City area and is owned by David Ingles Ministries Church, Inc.

History
The station began broadcasting in 1990 with the call letters KMSI. It has been a member of The Oasis Network.

Translators

External links
https://www.oasisnetwork.org

MSI
MSI